Westport is a town in Pawnee County, Oklahoma, United States. The population was 298 at the 2010 census, a gain of 12.9 percent over the figure of 264 in 2000.

History
The city is much newer than most towns in northeast Oklahoma. It was incorporated in the mid 1960s, after completion of Lake Keystone. Most of the residences were built between 1960 and 1979. Its first Federal census reported 146 residents in 1970. The census population peaked at 325 in 1990, then dropped to 264 in 2000, perhaps because of major damage inflicted by an F4 tornado that occurred as part of the April 26, 1991 tornado outbreak. Over 96 percent of the employed residents commuted to work in Stillwater or Tulsa.

Geography
Westport is located at  (36.196315, -96.360476).

Demographics

As of the census of 2000, there were 264 people, 99 households, and 82 families residing in the town. There were 109 housing units at an average density of 27.3 per square mile (10.5/km2). The racial makeup of the town was 87.88% White, 0.76% African American, 3.03% Native American, 0.76% Asian, and 7.58% from two or more races. Hispanic or Latino of any race were 1.89% of the population.

There were 99 households, out of which 29.3% had children under the age of 18 living with them, 80.8% were married couples living together, 2.0% had a female householder with no husband present, and 16.2% were non-families. 12.1% of all households were made up of individuals, and 6.1% had someone living alone who was 65 years of age or older. The average household size was 2.67 and the average family size was 2.86.

In the town, the population was spread out, with 22.0% under the age of 18, 8.7% from 18 to 24, 20.8% from 25 to 44, 36.4% from 45 to 64, and 12.1% who were 65 years of age or older. The median age was 44 years. For every 100 females, there were 91.3 males. For every 100 females age 18 and over, there were 92.5 males.

The median income for a household in the town was $54,250, and the median income for a family was $64,375. Males had a median income of $36,667 versus $32,083 for females. The per capita income for the town was $23,345. About 4.3% of families and 6.8% of the population were below the poverty line, including none of those under the age of eighteen and 15.6% of those 65 or over.

References

Towns in Pawnee County, Oklahoma
Towns in Oklahoma